Khan Bahadur Muhammad Yusuf Syed-Al-Hashmi (1887–1960; Sialkot, Punjab) was an educator, mentor, and reformer who achieved high distinction in English studies in British India, and taught many generations of students and scholars how Western and Oriental languages could be pursued to great educational advantage, skill development and cultural enrichment. He had a role in improving particularly the educational opportunities of the Europeans in British India and of the Muslims in the South Asia. He also contributed to the Pakistan Movement through advocacy, advice and character building.

Early life and family
Muhammad Yusuf Hashmi was born into an old Muslim noble Syed family (Hashmi-Qureshi) at a village in Sialkot District, which at the time was part of British India. The family was mostly land-based and had had active members for centuries in professional communities. He received his early education in the area schools and was equally proficient in several languages, particularly English, Arabic, Persian and Hindustani/Urdu. He was also trained in religion, law and community administration studies, as it was a tradition among the Muslim nobility to which his family belonged. Relatives well known in Indian public life lived in all parts of the South Asia, including Pir Syed Jammat Ali Shah (or Pir Syed Jamaat Ali Shah) of Ali Pur Syedan (also called Alipur Sharif) in Sialkot District and the Hashmi-Qureshi families of central and southern Punjab of which the roots are throughout Middle-East and central and southern Asia. Of his siblings, his three brothers made their mark in their respective professions, education, law and medicine, and his two sisters were tutored and educated at home, according to the family tradition, and married within the same family and another Syed-Gilani family of the area.

Career 
Hashmi finished his M.A. in English at the Forman Christian College in Lahore, with a First-Class-First position in the University of the Punjab. Upon completing his English and Arabic studies in 1909, he began his professional life. With competing offers of teaching appointments from Forman Christian College, Punjab University and Aligarh Muslim University, he chose his alma mater, Forman Christian College, at Dr. Ewing's (J. C. R. Ewing) invitation, and taught there for a short time before joining the Indian Education Service and proceeding to Calcutta, which besides being the seat of the British Government of India was the educational and cultural capital of British India. He taught both English Bengali, Hindi/Urdu and Arabic at Madrasa 'Aliya, which was established by Warren Hastings in 1781, lectured at the University of Calcutta, and superintended Baker Hostel there, producing the elite corps of Indians, Muslims (including scions of the Suhrawardy and Bogra families) and others, who later took over the reins of power from the British. He was the first Indian to be appointed as principal of this earliest modern institution of higher education in British India. As his students, colleagues and friends (including A. K. Fazlul Huq, Mayor of Calcutta, later Chief Minister of undivided Bengal and statesman who would move the Pakistan Resolution) wished that he rather stay on in Calcutta than be posted to any other place in India, he joined the Bengal Senior Education Service and remained in Calcutta until his retirement in 1943. The British Government of India and the Crown conferred the titles of Khan Sahib and Khan Bahadur on him for meritorious services to Indian education.

He returned to Sialkot in 1943 and devoted his energies to the Pakistan Movement nearly full-time. He was often called upon for advice by academic, social and political leaders of the time and he had a key consultative role in the 1944 Sialkot Convention which gave All India Muslim League a definite lead in undivided Punjab. In the process, together with friends in Punjab, he founded the Jinnah Islamia College (latterly Government Jinnah Islamia College) in the city in 1951. He was appointed the first principal of the college by the trustees. He accepted this appointment but declined the salary offered as principal saying his British pension was enough for his needs. He continued to serve the college through much of the 1950s.

Later years
Upon completing his tenure as principal of Jinnah Islamia College (latterly Government Jinnah Islamia College) Hashmi moved to Lahore. He died in 1960 and was buried in the same city, survived by a large family.

Writings
Muhammad Yusuf Hashmi mostly wrote Islamic Law books, textbooks and teaching methods material for English, Arabic, and Persian studies at Madrasa 'Aliya and for the University of Calcutta. A book translated by Khan Bahadur Muhammad Yusuf Syed-Al-Hashmi and Maulvi Wilayat Husain, The Fatawa-i-Qazi Khan, is one of the best Islamic law books on the topics of marriage, dower, divorce, legitimacy and guardianship of minors. These books had wide adoption in Bengal and in many other modern institutions of higher education in British India, leading to new legislation and educational policies in many Islamic countries.

References

Leaders of the Pakistan Movement
Pakistani educators
20th-century Indian educators
Pakistani nobility
1887 births
1960 deaths
People from British India
People from Sialkot
Punjabi people